STP Not LSD is the third album by the American punk rock band Angry Samoans, released in 1988 on PVC Records. The album was re-issued in 1990 by Triple X Records.

Track listing
Side one
"I Lost (My Mind)" (Mike Saunders, Gregg Turner) – 1:57 
"Wild Hog Rhyde" (Saunders, Turner) – 2:07 
"Laughing at Me" (Michael Bruce, Glen Buxton, Alice Cooper, Dennis Dunaway, Neal Smith) – 1:47 
"STP Not LSD" (Saunders) – 2:05 
"Staring at the Sun" (Saunders) – 1:36
"Death of Beewak" (Todd Homer, Saunders) – 2:07

Side two
"Egyptomania" (Homer, Turner) – 1:37 
"Attack of the Mushroom People" (Saunders) – 2:44
"Feet on the Ground" (Homer) – 1:18 
"Garbage Pit" (Saunders) – 1:40
"(I'll Drink to This) Love Song" (Saunders) – 2:04
"Lost Highway" (Saunders) – 2:25

Personnel
Angry Samoans
"Metal" Mike Saunders – vocals, rhythm guitar
Gregg Turner – vocals, guitar
Todd Homer – bass, vocals
Steve Drojensky – lead and rhythm guitar
Bill Vockeroth – drums

Production
Bill Inglot – producer, engineer
John Strother – engineer
Ken Perry – mastering

References

1988 albums
Angry Samoans albums
Triple X Records albums